Frieda Fishbein (born 7 March 1886, Romania, d. 6 September 1981, Brooklyn) was a Romanian American theatrical, film, television and literary agent for writers including Elmer Rice, George S Kaufman, Moss Hart, Jean-Paul Sartre, Jean Anouilh and Colleen McCullough.

Personal Life and Education
Fishbein was born in Romania, the oldest daughter of Molly and Osias Fishbein. The family emigrated to America in 1901. She was educated in the New Orleans public school system, then spent the majority of her adult life in New York City, initially Manhattan, moving to Brooklyn in later life.

Work
Fishbein worked as a stenographer in New Orleans in 1903. After moving to New York City, her first job was as a secretary in a movie company. In 1910 she was again working as a stenographer.

In 1929 Fishbein established the Frieda Fishbein Agency, a literary and theatrical agency, in New York City. In the same year, the playwright, director and producer Dore Schary described her as having “a stable of young writers, none of whom she could support, except with praise and enthusiasm.” He credited Fishbein with helping to get him his first job in Hollywood as a “$100-a-week writer” by introducing him to Harry Cohn, “the maharajah of Columbia [studio]”.

By 1932 she was on the advisory board of the New York Stage Society. Her agency moved to the New Amsterdam Theatre in 1937. During an interview in 1946 she made the observation that many writers who had returned from the war had bought back partly completed plays. She believed the war had given them stamina and that they were sticking to their craft “more tenaciously”. The following year she made theatrical headlines across America by developing a new approach to selling shows. She would arrange for scripts to be acted out by semi-pros, filmed and the reel was submitted to prospective producers. According to an interview in 1954, she would receive “about ten plays a week”. She would accept “about five a year, and would sell about 8-10 options a year.”

After Fishbein's death in 1981, her niece, Janice Fishbein, continued as the president of her agency.

Playwrights
Fishbein represented the following writers and plays: 
 1925 – Spencer Brodney Rebel Smith
 1929 – Elmer Rice Street Scene (This was after it had been turned down by several Broadway producers. It won the Pulitzer Prize for Drama); Wallace Thurman's Harlem; Elmer Rice See Naples and Die
 1930 – Moss Hart No Retreat, Once In A Lifetime (Subsequently, Fishbein brought a lawsuit against Hart contending that she was entitled to a percentage of his royalties from plays produced by Sam Harris. The matter was settled out of court for an undisclosed sum.)
 1931 – I J Golden Precedent
 1934 – Jacques Deval Prayer for the Living
 1937 – Simon Gantillon; Harold Igo Steel; Sidney Shields Marriage A La King, Martin Cumberland Climbing; Dr. Conrad K Gale Dr. Almighty
 1938 – Miss Trent Patterson The Lady Must Eat; Ralph Holmes The Travelling Salesman and the Farmer’s Daughter; Irving Ellman Crime Doesn’t Pay; Maria M Coxe If Ye Break Faith
 1939 – Pamela Burr The Odd Man; Wilson Starbuck Sea Dogs
 1941 – Frederick Schlick None But The Wounded; Because I Am A Woman
 1942 – E. Mawby Green and Edward Allen Feilbert The House In Paris
 1943 – Howard Buermann and Alfred Golden Help Wanted – Female
 1944 – George Taylor and George Savage The Phoenix and the Dwarfs
 1946 – Paul Bowles The Respectful Prostitutes, No Exit; John E Miller The Search for Lov (also producer) 
 1947 – Agent for Paul Bowles’ adaptation of Jean-Paul Sartre's The Flies
 1949 – Madeline Davidson and Maurice Glucher The Perfect Pattern; Howard Bluerman and Alfred Golden A Lovely Time
 1950 – John S Gordan For Each Man Kills
 1951 – Jean-Paul Sartre The Devil and God
 1953 – John Sheffield The Forgotten Land
 1960 – Weldon Sheerer California, Here I Come

Fishbein wrote at least one play herself, Pajama Tops in 1963.

Authors
She represented authors Peter Kenna, Sherwood Anderson, Katherine Hoskins, Donald Burgett and Alicen White.

Her biggest financial success came from representing Australian author Colleen McCullough. According to McCullough, she was making her sister a tuna fish casserole for her birthday and while looking through a list of agents she found Fishbein's name, which she took to be a sign.
McCullough's first novel Tim (1974) was followed by the global hit The Thorn Birds (1977), selling over 33 million copies. As a “multi-million dollar product” Fishbein was able to retire on her share of the book.

Act One
Fishbein appears as a character in Act One, a musical by James Lapine, adapted from the autobiography by Moss Hart. Her role is described “A literary agent. Highly respected in the community, so whatever plays she recommended for production were read with promptness and great enthusiasm. A bit of a character, she’s tough and realistic, but very supportive of her client, Moss.” The Teacher Resource Guide for the play adds Fishbein is “a highly respected literary agent who connects Hart with the producer Sam Harris, and his colleague, Max Siegel.”

Further reading
 Act One: An Autobiography of Moss Hart (1959) 
 Heyday: An Autobiography by Dore Schary (1979) 
 Hollywood Red: The Autobiography of Lester Cole (1981) 
 Dazzler: The Life and Times of Moss Hart by Steven Bach (2002)

References

1886 births
1981 deaths
Literary agents
American talent agents
American people of Romanian-Jewish descent
Romanian emigrants to the United States